The 1986–87 Scottish League Cup was the forty-first season of Scotland's second football knockout competition. The competition was won by Rangers, who defeated Celtic in the Final.

First round

Second round

Third round

Quarter-finals

Semi-finals

Final

References

General

Specific

1986–87 in Scottish football
Scottish League Cup seasons